The women's 57 kilograms (Lightweight) competition at the 2018 Asian Games in Jakarta was held on 30 August at the Jakarta Convention Center Assembly Hall.

Schedule
All times are Western Indonesia Time (UTC+07:00)

Results

Main bracket

Final

Top half

Bottom half

Repechage

References

External links
 
 Official website
 Official website

W57
Judo at the Asian Games Women's Lightweight
Asian W57